Fábio Diogo Agrela Ferreira (born 7 July 1992), known as Fábio China, is a Portuguese professional footballer who plays for C.S. Marítimo as a left-back or a left midfielder.

Club career
Born in Calheta, Madeira, China began playing at A.D.R. Prazeres. When the opportunity arose to move to Estrela da Calheta FC, his chairman did not authorise the transfer due to bad blood between the two clubs; he played competitive futsal until the situation was resolved.

China had trialled unsuccessfully on several occasions at C.S. Marítimo, but was taken on by the C-team under his former Calheta manager Nélson Gouveia, and signed a professional deal in January 2015 at age 22. He made his debut in the Primeira Liga on 15 May 2016 at the end of the season, playing the entirety of a 2–1 away loss against Moreirense F.C. under the management of Nelo Vingada.

China missed the middle of the 2016–17 campaign due to a three-month pubalgia. On 10 February 2018, he was sent off in a 3–0 defeat at Rio Ave FC. In May 2021, when his contract was due to expire, it was extended for two years.

References

External links

1992 births
Living people
Portuguese footballers
Madeiran footballers
Association football defenders
Association football midfielders
Primeira Liga players
Campeonato de Portugal (league) players
C.S. Marítimo players